Saraféré is a village and seat of the commune of Fittouga in the Cercle of Niafunke in the Tombouctou Region of Mali. The village lies on the Barra-Issa, the smaller and more easterly branch of the Niger River in the Inner Niger Delta.

Visit by Edmond Fortier
The French photographer, Edmond Fortier, visited the village in 1905-1906 and published a series of postcards.

References

Populated places in Tombouctou Region